Events from the year 1899 in the United States.

Incumbents

Federal Government 
 President: William McKinley (R-Ohio)
 Vice President: Garret Hobart (R-New Jersey) (until November 21), vacant (starting November 21)
 Chief Justice: Melville Fuller (Illinois)
 Speaker of the House of Representatives: Thomas Brackett Reed (R-Maine) (until March 4), David B. Henderson (R-Iowa) (starting December 4)
 Congress: 55th (until March 4), 56th (starting March 4)

Events

January
 January 1 – Queens and Staten Island merge with New York City.
 January 10 – The Tau Kappa Epsilon fraternity is founded at Illinois Wesleyan University in Bloomington, Illinois.
 January 17 – The United States takes possession of Wake Island.

February
 February 4 – The Philippine–American War begins as hostilities break out in Manila.
 February 6 – Spanish–American War: A peace treaty between the United States and Spain is ratified by the United States Senate.
 February 10 – Spanish–American War: The U.S. receives the Philippines, Guam, and Puerto Rico as a result of the Treaty of Paris.
 February 12–14 – Great Blizzard of 1899: Freezing temperatures and snow extend well south into North America, including southern Florida. It is the latest in a series of disasters to Florida's citrus industry.
 February 14 – Voting machines are approved by the U.S. Congress for use in federal elections.

March
 March 2 – In Washington state, Mount Rainier National Park is established.
 March 24 – George Dewey is made Admiral of the Navy.

April
 April 13 – Tahoe National Forest is established in California.
April 15 – Students at the University of California, Berkeley steal the Stanford Axe from Stanford University yell leaders following a baseball game, thus establishing the Axe as a symbol of the rivalry between the schools.

May
 May 31 – The launch of the Harriman Alaska Expedition.

June
 June 7 – Temperance movement crusader Carrie Nation enters a saloon in Kiowa, Kansas, and proceeds to destroy all the alcoholic beverages with rocks.
 June 12 – New Richmond Tornado: A tornado completely destroys the town of New Richmond, Wisconsin, killing 117 people and injuring more than 200.
 June 25 – Three Denver, Colorado newspapers publish a story (later proved to be a fabrication) that the Chinese government under the Guangxu Emperor is going to demolish the Great Wall of China.
 June 30 – Mile-a-Minute Murphy earns his famous nickname this day, after he becomes the first man to ride a bicycle for one mile in under a minute on Long Island.

July
 July 17 – America's first juvenile court is established in Chicago.
 July 19 – The Newsboys Strike takes place when the Newsies of New York City go on strike (strike lasts until August 2).
 July 30 – The Harriman Alaska Expedition ends successfully.

August
 August 3 – The John Marshall Law School is founded in Chicago, Illinois.
 August 10 – Major Taylor wins the world 1-mile professional cycling championship in Montreal, securing his place as the first African American world champion in any sport.
 August 17 – A hurricane makes landfall in North Carolina's Outer Banks, completely destroying the town of Diamond City.

September
  September 6  – Open Door Policy is a term in foreign affairs initially used to refer to the United States policy established in the late-nineteenth century and the early-twentieth century, as enunciated in Secretary of State John Hay's Open Door Note,
 September 14 – Henry H. Bliss becomes the first person to be killed by a motor vehicle in the United States. Upon disembarking from a streetcar in New York City, an electric-powered taxicab strikes and crushes him and he dies from his injuries the following morning.

October
 October 30 – The Augusta High School Building is completed in Augusta, Kentucky; Augusta Methodist College shuts down.

November

 November 4 – The Alpha Sigma Tau sorority is founded in Ypsilanti, Michigan.
 November 8 – The Bronx Zoo opens in New York City.
 November 21 – Vice President Garret Hobart dies of heart failure.

December
 December 2 – Philippine–American War – Battle of Tirad Pass: ("The Filipino Thermopylae") General Gregorio del Pilar and his troops are able to guard the retreat of Philippine President Emilio Aguinaldo before being wiped out.
 December 25 – The 6.7  San Jacinto earthquake shook the Inland Empire area of Southern California with a maximum Mercalli intensity of IX (Violent), causing six deaths and $50,000 in damage.

Undated
 The North Carolina General Assembly incorporates the town of Manteo, which was originally laid out as the Dare county seat in 1870.
 Gold is discovered in Nome, Alaska.
 Public Archives Commission established.

Ongoing
 Gay Nineties (1890–1899)
 Progressive Era (1890s–1920s)
 Lochner era (c. 1897–c. 1937)
 Philippine–American War (1899–1902)
 Boxer Rebellion (1899-1901) Boxer Rebellion#Allied intervention.2C the Boxer War.2C and the aftermath

Births
 January 9 – John A. Danaher, U.S. Senator from Connecticut 1939–1945 (died 1990).
 January 17 – Al Capone, gangster and crime boss (died 1947).
 February 4 – Virginia M. Alexander, African American physician (died 1949)
 February 22
Dwight Frye, actor (died 1943).
George O'Hara, silent film actor and screenwriter (died 1966).
 February 27 – Charles H. Best, medical scientist (died 1978 in Canada).
 April 11 – Percy Lavon Julian, African American research chemist (died 1975).
 April 28 – Mary Loveless, née Hewitt, immunologist (died 1991).
 April 29 – Duke Ellington, jazz musician and composer (died 1974).
 May 10 – Fred Astaire, né Austerlitz, dancer and singer (died 1987).
 May 15 – Leonard B. Jordan, U.S. Senator from Idaho 1962–1973 (died 1983).
 June 4 – Arthur Barker, son of Ma Barker and a member of the Barker-Karpis gang (died 1939)
 July 7
 Anna Baetjer, toxicologist (died 1984).
 Claude P. Dettloff, photographer (died 1978 in Canada).
 July 6 – Susannah Mushatt Jones, African American supercentenarian, oldest (confirmed) living person 2015–2016 (died 2016).
 July 17 – James Cagney, film actor (died 1986).
 July 21
 Hart Crane, poet (died 1932)
 Ernest Hemingway, fiction writer and journalist (died 1961).
 July 23 – Carl G. Fenner, botanist (died 1991).
 September 9 – Neil Hamilton, actor (died 1984).
 September 11 – Jimmie Davis, country and gospel singer-songwriter and politician (died 2000).
 October 3 – Gertrude Berg, American actress, screenwriter and producer (died 1966)
 November 5 – Margaret Atwood Judson, historian and author (died 1991).
 November 22 – Hoagy Carmichael, composer and singer (died 1981).
 December 20 – John Sparkman, U.S. Senator from Alabama 1946–1979 (died 1985).
 December 25 – Humphrey Bogart, film actor (died 1957).
 Caroline F. Ware, historian and New Deal activist (died 1990).

Deaths
 January 23 – Daniel O'Connell, journalist, poet and writer (born 1849)
 January 26 – Augustus Hill Garland, U.S. Senator from Arkansas 1885–1889 (born 1832).
 March 1 – Philip W. McKinney, 41st Governor of Virginia (born 1832).
 March 18 – Othniel Charles Marsh, paleontologist (born 1831).
 March 19 – Patrick Walsh, Irish-born U.S. Senator from Georgia 1894–1895 (born 1840).
 April 10 – Horace Tabor, U.S. Senator from Colorado in 1883 (born 1830).
 April 22 – Meriwether Lewis Clark Jr., founder of the Kentucky Derby (born 1846)
 April 24 – Richard J. Oglesby, U.S. Senator from Illinois 1873–1878 (born 1824).
 June 7 – Augustin Daly, dramatist and theater manager (born 1838).
 July 18 – Horatio Alger, Jr., Unitarian minister and author (born 1832).
 August 8 – Lucy Pickens, socialite, known during and after her lifetime as the "Queen of the Confederacy" (born 1832)
 August 9 – Arthur Morgan Known and wanted outlaw (born 1863)
 August 22 – Caspar Buberl, Bohemian-born sculptor (born 1834).
 September 9 – James B. Eustis, U.S. Senator from Louisiana 1876–1879 and 1885–1891 (born 1834).
 September 12 – Cornelius Vanderbilt II, businessman (born 1843).
 October 4 – Jimmy Logue, Philadelphia based burglar (born 1837).
 October 5 – James Harlan, U.S. Senator from Iowa 1865–1866 (born 1820).
 October 18 – Gussie Davis, African American songwriter (born 1863).
 October 28 – Ottmar Mergenthaler, German-born inventor (born 1854).
 October 30 – William H. Webb, shipbuilder and philanthropist (born 1816).
 November 21 – Garret Hobart, 24th Vice President of the United States from 1897 to 1899 (born 1844).
 November 25 – Robert Lowry, Baptist minister and hymn writer (born 1826).
 December 22 – Dwight L. Moody, preacher and publisher (born 1837).

See also
 List of American films of the 1890s
 Timeline of United States history (1860–1899)

References

Further reading
 . (Covers events May 1898-June 1905)

External links

 
1890s in the United States
United States
United States
Years of the 19th century in the United States